Polygala quitensis is a species of plant in the family Polygalaceae. It is endemic to Ecuador.

References

quitensis
Endemic flora of Ecuador
Critically endangered plants
Taxonomy articles created by Polbot
Taxa named by Nikolai Turczaninow